The Yankee Señor is a 1926 American silent Western film directed by Emmett J. Flynn and starring Tom Mix, Olive Borden, and Margaret Livingston.

Plot
As described in a film magazine review, civil engineer Paul Wharton receives a letter informing him that he is the heir to Don Fernando in Mexico. Juan Gutiérrez, a cousin, is in reality the leader of a bandit gang, fails in an attempt to fatally injure Paul by tying him on the back of a wild horse when Paul's talented horse Tony comes to his rescue. Juan then attempts to use Flora to compromise Paul with his fiancée and succeeds. Juan then lures Paul to a lonely hut, but Paul cleans up a trio of bandits. Paul then weds Manuelita, daughter of the Don.

Cast

Production
Mix selected Olive Borden for her role as the love interest due to her brown eyes. The film had Technicolor sequence involving a Mexican fiesta with Mix and Borden dancing. The high power lighting required for this process resulted in eye pain and headaches that severly affected several cast members including Mix, Livingston, and Carver. Some location scenes involving Mix on horseback were shot in Yellowstone National Park in Wyoming.

References

Bibliography
 Solomon, Aubrey. The Fox Film Corporation, 1915–1935: A History and Filmography. McFarland, 2011.

External links

 
 Glass slide

1926 films
1926 Western (genre) films
American black-and-white films
1920s English-language films
Films directed by Emmett J. Flynn
Fox Film films
Silent American Western (genre) films
1920s American films